Swing is an English language surname.  People with this surname include:

 Catherine Swing, Canadian television personality, director, and producer
 David Swing (1830–1894), American teacher and clergyman
 DeVante Swing (born 1969), American musician, songwriter, and record producer
 Jordan Swing (born 1990), American professional basketball player
 Joseph May Swing (1894–1984), American senior United States Army officer
 Phil Swing (1884–1963), American Republican politician from California
 Wes Swing (born 1982), American singer and songwriter based in Virginia
 William E. Swing (born 1936), American Episcopalian priest from West Virginia, Bishop of California from 1980 to 2006

Anglicised Irish-language surnames